Championship Tennis is a Canadian sports television series which aired on CBC Television in 1968.

Premise
Episodes consisted of round-robin tennis tournaments among amateur players from six nations. Games were edited and condensed to fit a one-hour time slot.

Colour commentary was provided by Robert Bédard with Bob McDevitt providing other play commentary. Alex Trebek was the series host.

The first episode featured a match between Ramanathan Krishnan (India) and Mike Belkin (Canada). Belkin faced Manuel Santana (Spain) on 19 October. Thomaz Koch (Brazil) and Tom Okker (Netherlands) competed in the 7 December 1968 episode.

Production
The series was recorded in Quebec City at the Civil Employees Tennis Club (club de tennis des employs civils).

Scheduling
This hour-long series was broadcast Saturdays at 1 p.m. from 7 September to 28 December 1968.

References

1968 Canadian television series debuts
1968 Canadian television series endings
CBC Television original programming
1960s Canadian sports television series